In the private sector, a quarterly finance report is a financial report that covers three months of the year, which is required by numbers of stock exchanges around the world to provide information to investors on the state of a company. "Private sector financial reports emphasize the ultimate impact of transactions for a given period"  (McKinney, 2004, p. 475).

In the public sector, quarterly reporting is meant to highlight a government's revenues and expenditures for a quarter of the fiscal year as it is defined for that entity (in the United States, the fiscal year is different for the federal government than it is for other levels of government). According to McKinney, "governments stress how transactions will affect near-term financing...[and] decisions are related to annual or biannual appropriations, emphasizing balances and transactions related to near-term government financing - the operating budget."   (2004, p. 475).

For the American context, see Form 10-Q.

References 

Financial reporting
Financial statements

External Links 

 Quarterly reports – What are they and why should companies publish them?
 How to read Earnings Reports